The Big 12 Conference Softball Coach of the Year is a college softball award given to the Big 12 Conference's most outstanding coach. The award has been given annually since 1996. Patty Gasso has won the award a record 14 times.

Winners

Winners by school

References

Awards established in 1996
Coach
NCAA Division I softball conference coaches of the year